Capstone Software was a subsidiary of IntraCorp, a Miami-based computer and video game company. Founded in 1984, Capstone created first-person games such as Corridor 7: Alien Invasion, William Shatner's TekWar and Witchaven, and is also known for releasing games based on movie/TV licenses. Capstone's first-person games used the Wolfenstein 3D engine, and later, the Build engine.

IntraCorp went bankrupt in 1996 and shut down all its operations, including Capstone Software. Capstone's last game, Corridor 8: Galactic Wars, never left the prototype stage and was never released. Capstone became VRTech, providing first-person buildouts of new construction condominiums using the Build engine. It eventually closed down.

Games
The following is a list of games developed and/or published by Capstone Software as well its parent company Intracorp.

Intracorp

Capstone Software

Published

Distributed
 Eternam
 Pinball Arcade
 Superman: The Man of Steel
 Trolls

Cancelled

References

External links
Capstone Software

Video game publishers
Video game companies established in 1984
Video game companies disestablished in 1996
Video game development companies
Defunct video game companies of the United States
Companies based in Miami
Defunct companies based in Florida